The Skjálfandafljót River is situated in the north of Iceland.

It has its source at the northwestern border of the icecap Vatnajökull on the Highlands of Iceland. From there it streams parallel to the Sprengisandur Highland road in a northern direction, flowing finally into Skjálfandi bay.

By following the river from its source at the Vatnajökull glacier all the way to the river mouth at Skjálfandi bay it's possible to see many waterfalls. Skjálfandafljót possesses a number of waterfalls, including Goðafoss. Other well-known waterfalls in Skjálfandafljót include Hrafnabjargafoss, Aldeyjarfoss, Barnafoss and Ullarfoss. 1

It was first descended by kayak by a team from the University of Sheffield (UK) in 1989.

At the north end of the Sprengisandur road, the river drops down 10m over  Aldeyjarfoss. Goðafoss is in the lowlands, very near Route 1.

There have been proposals to build a hydroelectricity power station along the river.

See also
List of rivers of Iceland
Waterfalls of Iceland

References

External links 

 Icelandic River Guide

Rivers of Iceland
North Iceland